C. reticulata  may refer to:
 Camellia reticulata, a plant  species native to southwestern China, in the Yunnan Province
 Citrus reticulata, the mandarin orange, a tree species
 Cyclaspis reticulata, a crustacean species in the genus Cyclaspis

Synonyms
 Cassia reticulata, a synonym for Senna reticulata, a plant species

See also